Yacamán is a surname. Notable people with the surname include:

Gustavo Yacamán (born 1991), Colombian racing driver
Miguel José Yacamán (born 1946), Mexican physicist